is a Japanese tokusatsu drama in Toei Company's Kamen Rider Series. It is the eighteenth series in the Heisei period run and the twenty-seventh series overall. Toei registered the Kamen Rider Ex-Aid trademark on June 13, 2016. The show premiered on October 2, 2016, one week after the finale of Kamen Rider Ghost, joining Doubutsu Sentai Zyuohger and later, Uchu Sentai Kyuranger in the Super Hero Time line-up.

Story

Emu Hojo is an intern in the Pediatrics Department at Seito University Hospital and a genius video gamer who goes by the alias "M". Emu was inspired to practice medicine after a doctor, the future minister of health Kyotaro Hinata saved his life from an illness when he was a child. Kyotaro also gave him a WonderSwan handheld video game console as a reward that ignited Emu's interest in video games. Recently, a video game company known as the Genm Corporation, or Genm Corp. for short has become aware of the existence of the Bugsters, a form of computer virus that spawns from their company's software bugs. Led by the mysterious Parad and his partner Graphite, the Bugsters manifest themselves in the physical world by infecting humans that play Genm Corp's video games at a cellular level. Once a Bugster fully manifests, the human host gradually fades away as a consequence of stress experienced by the host.

Genm Corp counters the Bugster threat by developing the Gamer Driver belts and a series of transformation and summon type trinkets, the Rider Gashats, for doctors who underwent a special procedure to be allowed to use its powers. One of the chosen doctors is Emu himself, who transforms into Kamen Rider Ex-Aid to save his patients from the Bugster viruses. But Ex-Aid learns of other doctors who are also Riders besides himself: elite surgeon Hiiro Kagami/Kamen Rider Brave, the unlicensed "dark doctor" Taiga Hanaya/Kamen Rider Snipe, and coroner Kiriya Kujo/Kamen Rider Lazer, who can transform into a motorcycle form. Assisted by Poppy Pipopapo, a Bugster who joined their side under the name Asuna Karino, the four also face the opposition of the prototype Ex-Aid Kamen Rider Genm, eventually revealed to be Genm Corp's CEO Kuroto Dan. Revealing himself to be the creator of the Bugsters after deleting Kiriya, Kuroto has been using them and the Doctor Riders to create "The Ultimate Game", an AR MMO called "Kamen Rider Chronicle", where everyone is given the power to become a Kamen Rider known as a Ride-Player in a fight for survival. Kuroto reveals that he infected Emu with the Bugster virus years ago, making him patient zero of the current Bugster infection. The group is then joined by Nico Saiba, Emu's gaming rival known as "N" who becomes Taiga's assistant.

Once being defeated for good by Emu, Kuroto is killed off by Parad who gained the ability to become Kamen Rider Para-DX as he completes Kamen Rider Chronicle with a revived Graphite and a briefly reprogramed Poppy, who becomes a Kamen Rider herself while Nico becomes a Ride-Player. Parad explains his intention to wipe out the human race with the game, revealing himself as Emu's Bugster counterpart while Poppy convinces a revived Kuroto to join the CR after reminding him of his mother whom she manifested from. Not long after, a new threat to both the Riders and Bugsters appeared in the form of the powerful Kamen Rider Cronus, revealed to be Kuroto's father Masamune Dan who is both the true mastermind of the first Zero Day and the "other" patient zero. Revealing his true colors once Kamen Rider Chronicle is completed, Masamune uses the game to further his plan, such as mass-producing Kamen Rider Chronicle Gashats worldwide. Later on, Kiriya is revived as Kamen Rider Lazer Turbo. In the final story arc, the Riders learn that the only way to stop Kamen Rider Chronicle is by destroying the Bugster who serves as its final boss: Gamedeus. When the Riders developed a means to defeat Gamedeus, Cronus retaliates by absorbing the Bugster and transforms into the new final boss Kamen Rider Gamedeus Cronus.

Casting and production
The Kamen Rider Ex-Aid trademark was registered by Toei on June 1, 2016.

The show features Lupin the Third Part 4 chief script writer Yuya Takahashi serving as chief script writer on a Kamen Rider series for the first time. TV Asahi producer Motoi Sasaki, who has produced various Kamen Rider shows as co-producer with a Toei producer in the past serves as chief producer for the first time. Takahito Ōmori, chief producer on Zyuden Sentai Kyoryuger and Kamen Rider Drive also produced it. The story and cast of this series was unveiled on at Press Conference on August 30, 2016.

Episodes

Given the show's video-game theme, each episode's title is written part in English, part in kanji, similar to that of most Japanese video game covers.

Films
Kamen Rider Ex-Aid made his debut as a cameo in Kamen Rider Ghost: The 100 Eyecons and Ghost's Fated Moment.

Kamen Rider Heisei Generations
A Movie War film, titled , was released in Japan on December 10, 2016. The film features Kamen Rider Ex-Aid teaming up with Kamen Rider Ghost, Kamen Rider Drive, Kamen Rider Gaim, and Kamen Rider Wizard as they battle a virus based on Bandai Namco Entertainment's video game character, Pac-Man. The professional wrestler Hiroshi Tanahashi was announced to be one of the main antagonists of the movie. In addition, Shunya Shiraishi (Kamen Rider Wizard) and Ryoma Takeuchi (Kamen Rider Drive) reprised their roles in the film respectively. The events of the movie take place between Episodes 10 and 11.

Ultra Super Hero Taisen
A crossover film, titled  featuring the casts of Kamen Rider Ex-Aid, Amazon Riders, Uchu Sentai Kyuranger, and Doubutsu Sentai Zyuohger, was released in Japan on March 25, 2017. This movie also celebrates the 10th anniversary of Kamen Rider Den-O and features the spaceship Andor Genesis from the Xevious game, which is used by the movie's main antagonists, as well as introduces the movie-exclusive Kamen Rider True Brave, played by Kamen Rider Brave's actor Toshiki Seto from Kamen Rider Ex-Aid, and the villain Shocker Great Leader III, played by the singer Diamond Yukai. In addition, individual actors from older Kamen Rider and Super Sentai TV series, Ryohei Odai (Kamen Rider Ryuki), Gaku Matsumoto (Shuriken Sentai Ninninger), Atsushi Maruyama (Zyuden Sentai Kyoryuger), and Hiroya Matsumoto (Tokumei Sentai Go-Busters) reprise their respective roles. The events of the movie takes place between episodes 23 and 24.

True Ending

 was released in the Japanese theaters on August 5, 2017, double billed with the film for Uchu Sentai Kyuranger. The events of the movie took place a few days after the main series' final episode. It features the movie-exclusives Kamen Rider Fuma and his Ninja-Players, as well as the movie version of the series' final antagonist Gamedeus. The next titular character, Kamen Rider Build made his movie debut in True Ending before his chronological TV debut in Episode 44 of Ex-Aid. The movie is part of Toei's partnership with Sony to release a special Gamer Driver's color scheme of PlayStation VR for PlayStation 4. The PlayStation VR Movie was released on July 13, 2017.

Heisei Generations Final

A Movie War film, titled  was announced to be released on December 9, 2017. Aside from the casts of Kamen Rider Build and Kamen Rider Ex-Aid, Shu Watanabe and Ryosuke Miura (Kamen Rider OOO), Sota Fukushi (Kamen Rider Fourze), Gaku Sano (Kamen Rider Gaim), and Shun Nishime (Kamen Rider Ghost) reprised their respective roles. The events of the movie took place a week after the film Kamen Rider Ex-Aid the Movie: True Ending.

"Tricks"
The  is a series of special episodes of Kamen Rider Ex-Aid.
 was a web-exclusive series distributed through  Toei's official YouTube channel. It accompanied the airing of the main series' episode the day after it.
 takes place between Episodes 1 and 2.
 takes place between Episodes 3 and 4.
 takes place between Episodes 4 and 5.
 takes place between Episodes 5 and 6.
 takes place between Episodes 6 and 7.
 was a web-exclusive series released on Toei's official YouTube channel, but the final episode is exclusive to the DVD. It takes place immediately after the Heisei Generations movie, but before Episode 11.

 was a web-exclusive special episode released on Toei Tokusatsu Fan Club. The story focuses on Hirro Kagami, as he battles the "Beast Rider Squad," which consists of evil replicas of Tiger from Ryuki, Beast from Wizard, Dark Kiva from Kiva, and Sasword from Kabuto, led by serial killer Takeshi Asakura also known as Kamen Rider Ouja, played by  Takashi Hagino from Kamen Rider Ryuki. It also marked the return of Foundation X from Kamen Rider W which hadn't made an appearance since Kamen Rider Fourze the Movie: Space, Here We Come!. The events of the special episode take place between episodes 14 and 15.
 is included as part of the Blu-ray releases of Kamen Rider Ex-Aid. It serves as a prequel to the main series and explores Taiga's backstory in greater detail, focusing specifically on the event that resulted in the loss of his medical license, ending his time with CR.

 is Televi-Kuns . The events of the special episode take place between Episodes 32 and 33.
 is Televi-Kun's "Hyper Battle DVD". It is connected to Kamen Rider Ex-Aid Trilogy: Another Ending.

Kamen Rider Ex-Aid Trilogy
 is a set of three V-Cinema releases that serve as spin-offs of characters from the Kamen Rider Ex-Aid series. The events of the films take place two years after the film,  Kamen Rider Heisei Generations Final: Build & Ex-Aid with Legend Rider.
 is a side story focusing on Hiiro Kagami and Taiga Hanaya. The V-Cinema came out on March 28, 2018.
 is a side story focusing on Parad and Poppy Pipopapo. The V-Cinema was released on April 11, 2018.
 is a side story focusing on Kuroto Dan and Kiriya Kujo. The V-Cinema was released on April 25, 2018.

Kamen Rider Genms
 is a web-exclusive crossver series of Toei Tokusatsu Fan Club between Kamen Rider Ex-Aid and Zero-One, which mainly stars both Tetsuya Iwanaga and Nachi Sakuragi as their respective characters. The theme song is "GAME CHANGER" performed by Hiroyuki Takami, who reprised his character in the first entry.
 is the first entry of the web-exclusive series released on April 11, 2021, comprises two episodes. The events of the special take place after Zero-One Others: Kamen Rider Vulcan & Valkyrie.
 is a sequel to the first entry of the web-exclusive series released on April 17, 2022, with the appearance of Smart Brain from Kamen Rider 555.

Kamen Rider Outsiders
 is a web-exclusive crossver series of Toei Tokusatsu Fan Club between Ex-Aid, Zero-One, 555, Ryuki, Decade, and Saber released on October 16, 2022, which is a direct sequel to Kamen Rider Genms. The theme song is "What's the Outsiders?" performed by m.c.A.T.

Novel
, written by Yuya Takahashi, is part of a series of spin-off novel adaptions of the Heisei Era Kamen Riders. The events of the novel take place three years after Kamen Rider Ex-Aid Trilogy: Another Ending. The novel was released on June 27, 2018.

Video game
, is the sixth installment of the Kamen Rider: Climax series, which was released on December 7, 2017 for PlayStation 4. It's a role-playing fighting game and featuring characters from Kamen Rider Ex-Aid and Kamen Rider Build.

Cast
: 
: 
: 
: 
, :
: 
: 
: 
: 
: 
: 
: 
: 
: 
Rider Gashat and Gashacon Weapon Voices: 
Narration,  Voice, Gashacon Bugvisor II/Buggle Driver II and Kamen Rider Chronicle Gashat Voices:

Guest cast

: 
: 
: 
: 
: 
: 
: 
: 
: 
: 
: 
:

Theme songs
Opening theme
"EXCITE"
Lyrics: Kanata Okajima, Daichi Miura
Composition: Carpainter, Kanata Okajima
Arrangement: UTA, Carpainter
Artist: Daichi Miura
Episodes: 2 - 11, 13, 14, 25 - 44
Episodes 1, 12, 15-24 and 45 do not feature the show's opening sequence. This song is used as the ending theme in episodes 1, 15, and 18-24, and an insert song in episodes 4, 12, 16, 17, 32, and 45.

Insert themes
"Let's Try Together"
Lyrics: BOUNCEBACK, kenko-p
Composition & Arrangement: Hirofumi Hibino
Artist: Kamen Rider Girls
Episodes: 13 - 15
"Wish in the dark"
Lyrics: Kyasu Morizuki, Mio Aoyama
Composition: Takehito Shimizu
Arrangement: Toru Watanabe
Artist: Hiroyuki Takami
Episodes: 17, 18
"PEOPLE GAME"
Lyrics: Yuya Takahashi
Composition: Katsumi Ohnishi
Arrangement: Toru Watanabe, ats-
Artist: Poppy Pipopapo (Ruka Matsuda)
Episodes: 24 - 26
"Real Game"
Lyrics: Takayuki Tazawa
Composition: Keiichi Miyako
Arrangement: Rayflower
Artist: Rayflower
Episodes: 29
"JUSTICE"
Lyrics: Mio Aoyama
Composition: Natsumi
Arrangement: Takehito Shimizu, Toru Watanabe
Artist: Hiroyuki Takami
Episodes: 33
"Time of Victory"
Lyrics: Misa Kuwatani, Kyasu Morizuki
Composition: Misa Kuwatani
Arrangement: ats-
Artist: Kamen Rider Girls
Episodes: 36

International broadcast

References

External links
Official website at TV Asahi 
Official website at Toei Company 
Official website for "Tricks" 
Official website for Kamen Rider Outsiders and Kamen Rider Genms 

Ex-Aid
2016 Japanese television series debuts
TV Asahi original programming
Television shows about video games
Television series about artificial intelligence
Television series about viral outbreaks
Augmented reality in fiction
Cyberpunk television series
Fiction about death games
Comic science fiction television series
Medical television series
Comedy drama
Science fiction television series
Action television series